North Salang or  Sālangi Shamāli is a village at an altitude of 3,365 meters in the Khinjan District of Baghlan Province in north-eastern Afghanistan, to the northern side of the Salang Tunnel.

Climate

North Salang has a tundra climate (Köppen: ET) with cool to mild summers and very cold winters. Precipitation is significantly higher than in much of the rest of Afghanistan due to North Salang's location on the windward side of the Hindu Kush mountain range, and mostly falls in the form of snow.

See also 
Baghlan Province

References

External links
Satellite map at Maplandia.com

Populated places in Baghlan Province